The Combat of the Côa (July 24, 1810) was a military engagement that occurred during the Peninsular War period of the Napoleonic Wars. It took place in the valley of the Côa River and it was the first significant battle for the new army of 65,000 men controlled by Marshal André Masséna, as the French prepared for their third invasion of Portugal.

As the British-Portuguese forces were outnumbered here, on July 22, General Arthur Wellesley, 1st Duke of Wellington sent Brigadier-General Robert Craufurd a letter, saying that he (Wellington) was "not desirous of engaging in an affair beyond the Coa." On July 24, Craufurd's Light Division, with 4,200 infantry, 800 cavalry, and six guns, was surprised by the sight of 20,000 troops under Marshal Michel Ney.  Rather than retreat and cross the river as ordered by Wellington, Craufurd chose to engage the French, narrowly avoiding disaster.

The French objective was to force the Light Division back across the Côa in order to besiege Almeida.  They succeeded after hard fighting, but then launched a costly assault across the Côa, suffering heavy casualties.

Background
The Third Portuguese campaign started with the construction of the Lines of Torres Vedras and the Siege of Ciudad Rodrigo.

Battle of the River Côa

Order of Battle
British-Portuguese forces engaged were:
Light Division: Major General Robert Craufurd 
1st Brigade: Lieut-Col Sydney Beckwith
1/43rd Foot
1/95th Regiment of Foot (Rifles) (1/2 battalion)
3rd Portuguese Caçadores
2nd Brigade: Lieut-Col Robert Barclay
1/52nd Foot
1/95th Regiment of Foot (Rifles) (1/2 battalion)
1st Portuguese Caçadores
Cavalry Brigade: Brig-Gen George Anson
14th Light Dragoons (3 Squadrons)
16th Light Dragoons (2 Squadrons)
1st King's German Legion Hussars
Chestnut Troop,  Royal Horse Artillery.

The engaged units of Ney's VI Corps included:
Infantry Division: Maj-Gen Julien Augustin Joseph Mermet (7,600)
Brigade: Brig-Gen Martial Maison-Rouge
25th Light Infantry Regiment (2 battalions) 
27th Line Infantry Regiment (3 battalions)
Brigade: Brig-Gen Mathieu Delabassé
50th Line Infantry Regiment (3 battalions)
59th Line Infantry Regiment (3 battalions)
Infantry Division: Maj-Gen Louis Henri Loison (6,800)
Brigade: Brig-Gen Édouard Simon
Legion du Midi (1 battalion)
Hanoverian Legion (2 battalions) 
26th Line Infantry Regiment (3 battalions)
Brigade: Brig-Gen Claude François Ferey
32nd Light Infantry Regiment (1 battalion)
66th Line Infantry Regiment (3 battalions)
82nd Line Infantry Regiment (2 battalions)
Corps Cavalry Brigade: Brig-Gen Auguste Lamotte (1,000)
3rd Hussar Regiment
15th Chasseurs à Cheval Regiment
Reserve Cavalry Brigade: Brig-Gen Charles Gardanne (1,300)
15th Dragoon Regiment
25th Dragoon Regiment
Artillery: four foot and two horse artillery batteries

French Offensive
Craufurd committed a serious tactical error by choosing to fight with an unfordable river at his back while badly outnumbered. As such, in the early hours of 24 July, after a night of torrential rain, Ney sent forth Ferey and Loison's divisions to engage the allies.

A company of the 95th Rifles came under fire from French artillery as they moved in to attack. French voltigeurs of the 32nd then came up and took the fight to the bayonet, and the heavily outnumbered British broke and fled. The guns of Almeida opened fire on the 95th Rifles, mistaking them for French because of their dark uniforms. They then fell under attack by the French 3rd Hussars, supported by two companies of dragoons.
British troops of the 43rd came to assist them. Though fierce fighting broke out, the French advance was halted.
Despite orders from Wellington to fall back across the river Côa, Craufurd decided to hold his ground as more French arrived and began to deploy in formation.

The 15th Chasseurs a Cheval then charged to the south to outflank the British 52nd Light Infantry, while Ferey's French brigade attacked the British positioned near a windmill positioned at the British right, advancing through rough-terrain while Almeida's guns were firing upon them. The French infantry charged the British with fixed bayonet and, under mounting pressure, the allies began to fall back, isolating themselves from the 43rd Light Infantry under attack by the 15th Chasseurs. The 3rd Hussars came into the fight and Craufurd's men took heavy casualties. All this time, while Ney's assaults were being slowed by awful terrain, Almeida was slowly being isolated from the allied force.

Craufurd, realising his situation that the French were threatening his only escape (the bridge crossing the river Côa), ordered a withdrawal across the river Côa, with the British 52nd and 43rd Light Infantry as well as the 95th Rifles protecting their retreat. For the British, matters only became worse. A supply wagon turned over and caused a traffic jam in the retreat across the bridge. The French were gradually driving back the British divisions protecting the withdrawal.

Craufurd then ordered these troops to fall back and take position the heights overlooking the bridge and hold that position until the retreat had been made. The French took the heights, but in a move that took the Ney's forces completely by surprise the allies made an assault and held their opponents at bay long enough for the main body of the British-Portuguese to make it across to the other side of the river Côa.

Assault across the Côa

With the French driving the Light Division back, Ney then attempted attacking across the Côa. In the first attempt, grenadiers of the 66th surged towards the bridge under a hail of musketry and cannon fire, failing to get more than halfway across the bridge. The second more strongly-pressed offensive was made by the Elite Chasseurs de la Siège light infantry. Oman writes that they had "flung themselves at the bridge, and pushed on till it was absolutely blocked by the bodies of the killed and the wounded, and till they themselves had been almost literally exterminated, for out of a battalion of little more than 300 men 90 were killed and 147 wounded in less than ten minutes." The final attack was once more led by the 66th which was beaten off with little difficulty.

Results
The battle ended with the French having, despite the setback at the bridge, driven the Light Division from the field. Having been beaten back and only narrowly escaped a total rout, Crauford's forces withdrew at midnight, leaving Masséna free rein to lay siege to Almeida.

Napier and Oman stated that the British Light Division held off the entire 20 000 troops under Ney. However, it was only Ferey and Loison's division that actually engaged the Light Division. French forces engaged were around 6,000 pitched against 4,000 British-Portuguese.

Casualties are hard to determine. Both the French and the British-Portuguese were biased. Imperial propaganda reported allied casualties to be at 1,200, while many British sources claimed the loss of 36 killed and 189 wounded as well as 83 missing. On the other hand, French casualties are easier to determine, as both the allies and French estimated around five hundred dead or wounded.  The great majority of these casualties were due to Ney's futile attack across the bridge.

Aftermath

The Third Portuguese campaign proceeded with the Battle of Bussaco.

Notes

References

Further reading

External links
Peninsular Wars battles and skirmishes  including the Côa Battle.
Action on the River Côa (includes links to photos of the bridge and area)
Autobiography of Harry Smith, excerpt from Chapter 5: Campaign of 1810 - The Battle of the Côa
 

Coa 1810
Coa
Coa
Coa
1810 in Portugal
Conflicts in 1810
July 1810 events